Aethalida is a genus of tiger moths in the family Erebidae that occur in the Sundaland and Philippines.

Species 
 Aethalida banggaiensis (Nieuwenhuis, 1948)
 Aethalida borneana Holloway, 1988
 Aethalida conflictalis (Walker, 1864)
 Meringocera plutonica Felder, 1874
 Aethalida dohertyi (Hampson, 1901)
 Aethalida dora (Semper, 1899)
 Aethalida hollowayi Dubatolov & Kishida, 2005
 Aethalida owadai Dubatolov & Kishida, 2005
 Aethalida pasinuntia (Stoll, 1782)
 Meringocera tricolor Pagenstecher, 1888
 Pangora burica Holland, 1900
 Arctia caja amboinensis Swinhoe, 1916
 Pericallia rudis albidior Rothschild, 1935
 Aethalida quadrimaculata (Talbot, 1929)
 Aethalida rudis (Walker, 1864)
 Aethalida distinguenda Walker, 1864 [1865]
 Pericallia distinguenda ab. reducta Rothschild, 1914
 Aethalida whiteheadi (Rothschild, 1910)

References
 
 , 2005: A review of the genus Aethalida F. Walker, 1865, with description of a new species (Lepidoptera, Arctiidae). Tinea 19 (1): 48-58.

Spilosomina
Moth genera